Francisco Solís was a Roman Catholic prelate who served as Bishop of Drivasto (?–1540).

Biography
Francisco Solís served as Bishop of Drivasto until 1540. While bishop, he was the principal co-consecrator of Juan de Zumárraga, Bishop of México (1533).

References 

16th-century Albanian Roman Catholic bishops